Sang Tu Aahes Ka? is a Marathi Horror Drama produced by Vidyadhar Pathare under the banner of Iris Productions. The show premiered on 7 December 2020 on Star Pravah. It starred Siddharth Chandekar, Shivani Rangole and Saniya Chaudhari in lead roles.

Plot 
Superstar Swaraj Joshi makes a comeback into films after three years, but with a haunting past. While Swaraj celebrates his birthday with his family, Vaibhavi longs to meet to him. Later, in cruel of twist of fate, Vaibhavi appears in the path of track. After that, Durgesh makes scene while Swaraj and his family enjoys a grand lunch. Elsewhere Vaibhavi gets rescued but keeps incurring horrifying visions. Swaraj appoints Vaibhavi as his fathers doctor. Vaibhavi admires Swaraj while he plants a Tulsi outside the main door. Irked by their increasing closeness, Krutika warns Vaibhavi. After that, Krutika angry ends up hurting herself when she try to destroy the Tulsi plant. Later, Durgesh infuriates the Ghost by discreetly getting hold of Swaraj's diary. Swaraj gets tensed after losing an important dairy. Unaware of Krutika and Durgesh's plan. Later, Vaibhavi gets accused of theft. After few hours, Swaraj got that his diary not theft by Vaibhavi but his dairy theft by none other than Krutika and Durgesh. After that Swaraj's demand that Krutika and Durgesh apologise to Vaibhavi for their silly behaviour. Then, Krutika apologise to him for her behaviour. Vaibhavi gets suspicious about Abhay when he locks himself inside Shashikant's room. She gets possessed by spirit while drawing a rangoli. A sense curiosity arises in the ghost about her connection with Vaibhavi. Later, the ghost tries to communicate with her. Krutika panics after dreaming of Vaibhavi and Swaraj getting married. Later, she hurts Swaraj. Sulakshana vents out her fury on Vaibhavi and Krutika for inflicting a wound on Swaraj. Later, she apologises to Vaibhavi while Krutika gives an ultimatum to Abhay. Doctor Vaibhavi and Swaraj goes on a date and she gifts him his ex-wife photo and tells Swaraj to bring all the photos of her back which he does and they become friends and Krutika is irked of their increasing closeness and on his wedding day Swaraj in attempt to save Vaibhavi hurts himself and becomes temporary blind and he goes to his farmhouse with his family and there Sulakshana black magic doesn't works due to good energy and she poisons Shashikant but Vaibhavi comes and saves him Deepti learns that Swaraj likes Vaibhavi and helps him in this and they return to Mumbai and Dr. Vaibhavi meets Ghost Vaibhavi and she shows her the truth which she tells to Swaraj who instead bans her entry in the house and after some time she meets Swaraj and he gives her one chance and Sulakshana pushes Shashikant from stairs and he dies and Dr. Vaibhavi behaves like Swaraj's ex-wife and her asks her to stop for few days and she tells the truth of Sulakshana to Swaraj who becomes angry on Sulakshana  and Kabir proposes Vaibhavi who says yes making Swaraj sad who loves her and on engagement day he proposes her in front of all and she also confess that she loves him and they both got married  and comes home, to Sulakshana's surprise. Vaibhavi threatens Sulakshana who sees ghost Vaibhavi in Dr. Vaibhavi and they plan to expose her and on Satyanarayan pooja Kabir by hacking sends the clip to Abhay and Sulakshana confess that she killed the people because she want to be powerful so she also wants to kill Swaraj as she killed his mother and she will gain more power by killing Swaraj  and is arrested but before leaving she transfers her evil powers to Dipti and Durgesh and tells her black shadow to kill Dr. Vaibhavi after she goes and the shadow moves towards Dr. Vaibhavi but ghost Vaibhavi saves her and she tells Vaibhavi that she will be  born to her and asks her to wait for her and for one last time she is seen by all and Swaraj becomes emotional seeing her and says that her true love won and Seema tells them both to complete the pooja and in the evening Durgesh is crying and Dipti is telling that Sulakshana doesn't like that he is crying and their eyes turn yellow and they see towards empty chair and says that Sulakshana are you hear and Sulakshana laughs and the show ends on its name that it "Sang tu ahes ka" indicating that it might return with its second season.

Cast

Main
 Siddharth Chandekar as Lavdya Swaraj Joshi, Dr. Vaibhavi's and ghost Vaibhavi's husband
 Saniya Chaudhari as ghost Vaibhavi, Swaraj's ex-wife
 Shivani Rangole as Dr. Vaibhavi (Sona), Swaraj's wife

Recurring
 Sulekha Talwalkar as Sulakshana
 Bhagyashri Dalvi as Dipti (Swaraj's sister)
 Siddhi Patne / Dipti Lele as Shambhavi (Dr. Vaibhavi's sister)
 Rohan Gujar as Kabir Lavdya
 Tejas Dongre as Lavdya Durgesh (Swaraj's brother)
 Vandana Pandit-Sheth as Dr. Vaibhavi's Aaji
 Disha Danade as Seema
 Pooja Katurde as Krutika
 Manoj Kolhatkar as Abhay (Krutika's father)

Reception

Mahaepisode (1 hour) 
 7 February 2021
 14 March 2021
 15 August 2021

Ratings

References

External links 
 Sang Tu Aahes Ka? at Disney+ Hotstar
 

Marathi-language television shows
2020 Indian television series debuts
Star Pravah original programming
2020s supernatural television series
Indian horror fiction television series
2021 Indian television series endings